Messier 56 (also known as M56 or NGC 6779) is a globular cluster in the constellation Lyra. It was discovered by Charles Messier in 1779. It is angularly found about midway between Albireo (Beta (β) Cygni) and Sulafat (Gamma (γ) Lyrae). In a good night sky it is tricky to find with large (50–80 mm) binoculars, appearing as a slightly fuzzy star.

M56 is about 32,900 light-years away from Earth and measures roughly 84 light-years across, containing 230,000 solar masses. This cluster has an estimated age of 13.70 billion years and is following a retrograde orbit through the Milky Way. The properties of this cluster suggest that it may have been acquired during the merger of a dwarf galaxy, of which Omega Centauri forms the surviving nucleus.

The brightest stars in M56 are of 13th magnitude, while it contains only about a dozen known variable stars, such as V6 (RV Tauri star; period: 90 days) or V1 (Cepheid: 1.510 days); other variable stars are V2 (irregular) and V3 (semiregular). In 2000, a diffuse X-ray emission was tentatively identified coming from the vicinity of the cluster. This is most likely interstellar medium that has been heated by the passage of the cluster through the galactic halo. The relative velocity of the cluster is about 177 km s−1, which is sufficient to heat the medium in its wake to a temperature of 940,000 K.

M56 is part of the Gaia Sausage, the hypothesised remains of a merged dwarf galaxy.

Gallery

See also
 List of Messier objects

References and footnotes

External links

 Messier 56, SEDS Messier pages
 Messier 56, Galactic Globular Clusters Database page
 Hubble snaps a collection of ancient stars, August 26, 2012, TG Daily
 
 

Messier 056
Messier 056
056
Messier 056
 Gaia-Enceladus
Astronomical objects discovered in 1779